Ildikó Szabó-Erdélyi (born 19 July 1955 in Vásárosnamény, Szabolcs-Szatmár-Bereg) is a retired long jumper from Hungary. She won two medals at the European Indoor Championships.

Achievements

References
sports-reference

External links

1955 births
Living people
People from Vásárosnamény
Hungarian female long jumpers
Athletes (track and field) at the 1976 Summer Olympics
Olympic athletes of Hungary
Sportspeople from Szabolcs-Szatmár-Bereg County
20th-century Hungarian people